Pattana Football Club (Thai สโมสรฟุตบอลพัฒนา), is a Thai football club based in Chonburi, Thailand. The club is currently playing in the Thailand Amateur League Eastern Region.

Record

References

 http://www.pattanafc.com/th/
 https://www.youtube.com/watch?v=S-_JUSL6voM
 http://www.manager.co.th/South/ViewNews.aspx?NewsID=9570000050119
 https://www.youtube.com/watch?v=Jj_MG0pfuFY
 http://www.buraphanews.com/index.php?option=com_content&task=view&id=15711&Itemid=1
 http://www1.siamsport.co.th/football/premierleague/view.php?code=150510194931

External links
 Facebookpage

Association football clubs established in 2014
Football clubs in Thailand
Sport in Chonburi province
2014 establishments in Thailand